Brian O'Regan may refer to:

 Brian O'Regan (chemist), co-inventor of dye-sensitised solar cells
 Brian O'Regan (Gaelic footballer) (born 1983), Irish Gaelic footballer